Priya Krishnaswamy is an alumna of the Film and Television Institute of India (FTII), Pune, where she specialised in film editing.

She is a 2-time National Award-winning Indian film producer, writer, director and editor who works predominantly in Hindi and Tamil cinema.

In 2004, her English language documentary film, 'The Eye of the Fish - the Kalaris of Kerala' won the National Award for Best Arts / Cultural film.

She made her feature film directorial debut with the Hindi film Gangoobai (2013), which was a product of NFDC's acclaimed screenwriters' lab in 2009.

She wrote, edited, directed and produced the Tamil language thriller Baaram (2020) which won the National Award for Best Tamil Feature Film in 2019.

Filmography

References

External links 

Living people
21st-century Indian film directors
Women writers from Maharashtra
Hindi-language film directors
Tamil-language film directors
Indian women screenwriters
Indian women film directors
Year of birth missing (living people)